= Alexandra McCalla =

Alexandra McCalla is a Toronto-based consultant on business transformation for the technology sector. She was born in Canada and raised in the United Kingdom by Jamaican-British parents.

== Career ==
McCalla began her career as a business consultant and also worked with tech-startups in both Silicon Valley and Toronto.

McCalla, alongside Bashir Khan, are the founders of AirMatrix, which builds millimetre precision 3D drone roads. After raising $400,000 from angel investors, she earned additional funding from National Research Council Canada. At its inception, the company was the only startup in the world to have autonomous drone flight, and has worked with NASA and Transport Canada.

== Activism ==
As a founding member of the Coalition of Innovation Leaders Against Racism, McCalla works with other leaders in business and technology to combat systemic racial barriers. She has also worked with the Black Innovation Fellowship Bootcamp, which supports early-stage Black tech leaders.

== Honours and awards ==
McCalla was awarded a $100,000 prize from Communitech Fierce Founders in 2020. In 2021, she was recognized on The Globe and Mail list of 50 innovators making change in Canada.
